Amik Sherchan (born 1944) is a Nepalese politician and current Governor of Lumbini Province of Nepal. He is former chairman of Janamorcha Nepal. He served as the Deputy Prime Minister & Health and Population Minister of Nepal in the interim government under Girija Prasad Koirala cabinet. He also served as the 2nd Governor of Gandaki Province of Nepal. He is active as a politician and prominent leader since 1967. He was elected as a member of the Pratinidhi Sabha (1991 - 1994) and Member of 1st Constituent Assembly (2008 - 2012) from Chitwan.

Personal life
Sherchan was born in Okharbotkhani, Myagdi District, to Badi Bahadur Sherchan and Umadevi Sherchan. He completed his undergraduate degree in political science.

References

1949 births
Living people
People from Myagdi District
People from Chitwan District
Nepalese communists
Governors of Gandaki Province
Nepal MPs 1991–1994
Governors of Lumbini Province
Thakali people

Members of the 1st Nepalese Constituent Assembly